Phạm Lực (Huế, 1943) is a Vietnamese painter. Pham Luc served in the North Vietnamese army as a painter. Luc has exhibited paintings in Vietnam and overseas, and continues to paint. He has one daughter and one son, and lives in Hanoi.

He was interviewed in Ken Burns's series The Vietnam War.

References

1943 births
Living people
20th-century Vietnamese painters
21st-century Vietnamese painters